Pilgrim Reformed Church Cemetery is a historic church cemetery located near Lexington, Davidson County, North Carolina.   It is associated with the Pilgrim Reformed Church, founded about 1757 By a man of the name Valentine Leonhardt. It contains approximately 350 burials, with the earliest gravestone dated to 1781.   It features a unique collection of folk gravestones by local stone cutters erected in Davidson County in the late-18th and first half of the 19th centuries. The church was the first Pilgrim church in North Carolina.

It was listed on the National Register of Historic Places in 1984.

References

External links
 
 

Protestant Reformed cemeteries
Cemeteries on the National Register of Historic Places in North Carolina
Cemeteries in Davidson County, North Carolina
National Register of Historic Places in Davidson County, North Carolina